John Morgan Henderson (September 10, 1868 – March 16, 1947) was an American politician.

Henderson served in the Texas House of Representatives as a Democrat 1907-1909 and then in the Texas State Senate 1914–1919, He served as president pro tem of the senate.

Notes

1868 births
1947 deaths
Democratic Party members of the Texas House of Representatives
Democratic Party Texas state senators
Presidents pro tempore of the Texas Senate